Ernst Eggerbauer (16 April 1932 – 10 May 1995) was a German ice hockey player. He competed in the men's tournament at the 1960 Winter Olympics.

References

External links
 

1932 births
1995 deaths
Olympic ice hockey players of Germany
Olympic ice hockey players of the United Team of Germany
Ice hockey players at the 1960 Winter Olympics
Sportspeople from Füssen